Trimeresurus septentrionalis, commonly known as the Nepal pit viper or northern white-lipped pit viper, is a venomous pit viper species found in Bangladesh, Bhutan, Nepal and India.

Description
Total length males 610 mm, females 730 mm.

The head scalation consists of 10–11(12) upper labials, the first of which are fused to the nasal. The head scales are small, subequal and feebly imbricate, smooth or weakly keeled. The supraoculars are narrow and undivided with 9–11 interocular scales between them. The temporal scales are smooth.

Midbody there are 21 longitudinal dorsal scale rows. There are 162–172 ventrals in males, 160–181 in females. The subcaudals are paired and number 68–83 in males, 55–71 in females. The hemipenes are without spines.

The colour pattern is green above. The belly is green, yellowish or white below. A faint ventrolateral stripe present in all males, but absent in females. The end of tail not mottled brown.

Holotype: MHNG 1404.31

Geographic range
It is found in Bangladesh, Bhutan, Nepal and northwestern India (Simla). The type locality is given as "Nepal 83o 55' 28o 15' 1500 m (Nähe Pokhara)". Regenass & Kramer (1981) list the type locality as "Hyangcha (Nepal) 83o 55' E.L. 28o 15' N.B. 1500 m". Holotype: MHNG 1404.31.

Taxonomy
Elevated to a species, T. septentrionalis, by Giannasi et al. (2001). Returned to a subspecies, T. a. septentrionalis, by Leviton et al. (2003). Elevated to a species in another genus, Cryptelytrops septentrionalis, by Malhotra & Thorpe (2004). Returned to genus Trimeresurus and placed in subgenus Trimeresurus (Trimeresurus) by David et al. (2011). (See synonyms.)

References

Further reading

 Einfalt P. 2002. Haltung und Vermehrung von Trimeresurus albolabris (Gray 1842). Elaphe 10 (4): 31-36.
 Gumprecht A. 2001. Die Bambusottern der Gattung Trimeresurus Lacépède Teil IV: Checkliste der Trimeresurus-Arten Thailands. Sauria 23 (2): 25-32
 Kramer E. 1977. Zur Schlangenfauna Nepals. Rev. suisse Zool. 84 (3): 721-761.
 Parkinson CL. 1999. Molecular systematics and biogeographical history of Pit Vipers as determined by mitochondrial ribosomal DNA sequences. Copeia 1999 (3): 576-586
 

septentrionalis
Snakes of Asia
Reptiles of Bangladesh
Reptiles of Bhutan
Reptiles of India
Reptiles of Nepal
Reptiles described in 1977